El Jebha is a little port town in the northern part of Morocco. This Mediterranean coastal place is situated in the Rif Mountains, and across the route that takes traffic from the Northwestern part to the Northeastern part of Morocco. El Jebha, is the capital of the district (cercle) Mtiwa, which is part of Chefchaouen Province in the region of Tanger-Tetouan-Al Hoceima.

Name
The name of the town is based on its location at the foot of a set of mountains. El Jebha is the Arabic equivalent of ‘forehead’; the mountains that surround El Jebha stand out as if the town is the forehead of a chain of mountains. Hence, the name El Jebha. During the Spanish occupation of Northern Morocco between 1912 and 1956, the town was called Puerto Capaz. The placename paid homage to africanista colonel .

Economy
The two main sources of income are fishery and trade. As one of the most important coastal towns in the near surroundings El Jebha has an own harbour where many fisher boats, large and small, are anchored. Furthermore, the harbour is welcome and useful for many Europeans who are passing through the area in a tour around the Mediterranean sea.

References

Mediterranean port cities and towns in Morocco
Populated places in Chefchaouen Province